Godfroid Emmanuel Mahi Ebem (born December 24, 1983 in Yaoundé) is a former Cameroonian footballer, who last played for Nur Zagreb.

Career
The defender played for NK Inter Zaprešić in the Croatian Prva HNL.

Ebem finished his career after a year-long stint in 2014 at the fifth-tier Croatian side Nur Zagreb.

References

1983 births
Living people
Footballers from Yaoundé
Cameroonian footballers
Cameroonian expatriate footballers
HNK Orašje players
FK Sloboda Tuzla players
Expatriate footballers in Bosnia and Herzegovina
NK Hrvatski Dragovoljac players
NK Imotski players
HNK Segesta players
NK Inter Zaprešić players
Croatian Football League players
Expatriate footballers in Croatia
Cameroonian expatriate sportspeople in Croatia
Association football defenders